Chen Rong may refer to:
 Chen Rong (painter) (ca. 1200–1266), painter of the Southern Song Dynasty 
 Chen Rong (athlete) (born 1988), Chinese long-distance runner
 Chen Rong (footballer) (born 2001), Chinese association footballer

See also
 Shen Rong (born 1936), Chinese writer, also known as Chen Rong
 Armando Chin Yong (1958–2011), also known as Chen Rong, Malaysian opera singer